Xiantao West railway station is a railway station located in Xiantao City, Hubei Province, People's Republic of China, on the Hanyi Railway which operated by Wuhan Railway Bureau, China Railway Corporation.

The station is located near Leichang Village of Sanfutan Town (三伏潭镇), at a fairly large distance from Xiantao's city center: around 30 km straight-line distance, or some 40 km by highway.

During the construction it was expected that, once railway service starts, the station would serve some 1500 passengers daily.

History
The station was opened on July 1, 2012, along with the new Wuhan–Yichang railway.

Nearby stations

References

Railway stations in Hubei
Railway stations in China opened in 2012